Eicher is a German surname. Notable people with the surname include:

Ashley Eicher, on-air entertainment personality from Louisville, Kentucky who competed in the Miss America pageant
Benjamin Eicher (born 1974), film director
David J. Eicher (born 1961), American amateur astronomer and author
Edward C. Eicher (1878–1944), American politician
Manfred Eicher (born 1943), German record producer, the founder of the ECM record label
Stephan Eicher (born 1960), Swiss chansonnier

German-language surnames